The 2009 Pro Tour season was the fourteenth season of the Magic: The Gathering Pro Tour. It began on 17 January 2009 with Grand Prix Los Angeles, and ended on 22 November 2009 with the conclusion of the 2009 World Championship in Rome. The season consisted of nineteen Grand Prixs, and four Pro Tours, located in Kyoto, Honolulu, Austin, and Rome. At the end of the season, Yuuya Watanabe was awarded the Pro Player of the Year, making him the first player to win both that title and the Rookie of the Year title which he had won two years prior. Frank Karsten, Kamiel Cornelissen, and Antoine Ruel were inducted into the Hall of Fame at the world championships in Rome.

Mode 

Four Pro Tours and nineteen Grand Prixs will be held in the 2009 season. Further Pro Points will be awarded at national championships. These Pro Points will be used mainly to determine the Pro Player club levels of players participating in these events, but also decide which player will be awarded the Pro Player of the year title at the end of the season. Based on final standings Pro Points were awarded as follows:

Grand Prix – Los Angeles, Rotterdam 

GP Los Angeles (17–18 January)
Attendance: 834
Format: Extended
 Luis Scott-Vargas
 Brett Piazza
 Saul Alvarado
 Mat Marr
 Michael Jacob
 Carl Hendrix
 Mark Herberholz
 Asher Hecht

GP Rotterdam (21–22 February)
Attendance: 1227
Format: Limited
 Arjan van Leeuwen
 Robert van Meedevort
 Shuhei Nakamura
 Alex Fanghänel
 Aaron Brackmann
 Michal Hebky
 Tomas Langer
 Reinhold Kohl

Pro Tour – Kyoto (27 February – 1 March 2009) 

Pro Tour veteran Gabriel Nassif defeated Luis Scott-Vargas in the finals of Pro Tour Kyoto, giving him his first individual title in his ninth Top 8.

Tournament data 
Prize pool: $230,795
Players: 381
Format: Standard, Booster Draft
Head Judge: Riccardo Tessitori

Top 8

Final standings

Pro Player of the year standings

Grand Prixs – Chicago, Hanover, Singapore, Kobe, Barcelona, Seattle 

GP Chicago (7–8 March)
Attendance: 1230
Format: Legacy
 Gabriel Nassif
 Andrew Probasco
 Paul Rietzl
 James Mink
 Brian Kowal
 Tommy Kolowith
 David Caplan
 Brian Six

GP Kobe (18–19 April)
Attendance: 545
Format: Extended
 Tomoharu Saitou
 Yuuya Watanabe
 Kuo Tzu-Ching
 Kentarou Yamamoto
 Katsuya Ueda
 Keiichi Kondou
 Kenji Hamamoto
 Ryouma Shiozu

GP Hanover (13–14 March)
Attendance: 925
Format: Extended
 Lino Burgold
 Gaudenis Vidugiris
 Lukas Kraft
 Karim Bauer
 Kenny Öberg
 Pascal Vieren
 Helmut Summersberger
 Ondra Posolda

GP Barcelona (23–24 May)
Attendance: 1495
Format: Standard
 Joel Calafell
 Riccardo Neri
 Paulo Vitor Damo da Rosa
 Samuel Black
 Hugo De Jong
 Sean Og Murphy
 Ricardo Venancio
 George Paraskuopoulos

GP Singapore (21–22 March)
Attendance: 370
Format: Extended
 Tomoharu Saitou
 Masaya Kitayama
 Chin Heng Tan
 Yuuta Takahashi
 Yong Han Choo
 Liang Chen
 Samuel Black
 Kuo Tzu-Ching

GP Seattle (30–31 May)
Attendance: 1127
Format: Standard
 Yann Massicard
 Benjamin Lundquist
 Paulo Vitor Damo da Rosa
 Charles Gendron Dupont
 Luis Scott-Vargas
 Nicolay Potovin
 Michael Jacob
 Ari Lax

Pro Tour Honolulu (5–7 June 2009) 
In his second Pro Tour finals appearance, Kazuya Mitamura defeated Pro Tour newcomer Michal Hebky.

Tournament data 
Prize pool: $230,795
Players: 396
Format: Booster Draft, Block Constructed
Head Judge: Toby Elliot

Top 8

Final standings

Pro Player of the year standings

Grand Prixs – Sao Paulo, Boston, Brighton, Bangkok, Niigata, Prague, Melbourne 

GP São Paulo (13–14 June)
Attendance: 639
Format: Standard
 Daniel Almeida Alvez
 Andres Monsalve
 Guilherme Vieira
 Wendell Santini
 Allison Abe
 Diego Crusius
 Juan Veliz
 Daniel Frias

GP Bangkok (22–23 August)
Attendance: 414
Format: Limited
 Shingou Kurihara
 Martin Juza
 Koutarou Ootsuka
 Matteo Orsini Jones
 Ruud Warmenhoven
 Yuuya Watanabe
 Ryan Luo
 Zhiyang Zhang

GP Melbourne (10–11 October)
Attendance: 416
Format: Limited
 Yuuya Watanabe
 Tomoharu Saitou
 Marcus Teo
 Shane Daliston
 Brett Hughes
 Jacky Zhang
 Joel Piotto
 Steven Aplin

GP Boston (1–2 August)
Attendance: 1503
Format: Limited
 Marlon Egolf
 Ben Stark
 David Feinstein
 Jason Lundberg
 Jonathan Pearlman
 Brian Lynch
 Bradley Wojceshonek
 Zach Efland

GP Niigata (29–30 August)
Attendance: 722
Format: Limited
 Tsuyoshi Ikeda
 Shingou Kurihara
 Ren Ishikawa
 Hajime Nakamura
 Sho Ishikawa
 Takaya Saitou
 Gaudenis Vidugiris
 Yuuya Watanabe

GP Brighton (8–9 August)
Attendance: 760
Format: Limited
 Olivier Ruel
 Martin Juza
 Dennis Stone
 Mark Dictus
 Kevin Grove
 Robbert Menten
 Reinhold Kohl
 Joseph Jackson

GP Prague (5–6 September)
Attendance: 1541
Format: Limited
 Jan Schmidt
 Yuuya Watanabe
 Bojan Zunko
 Ognjen Cividini
 Julien De Graat
 Lukas Vozdecky
 Marcel Kondrk
 Radek Kaczmarczyk

Pro Tour Austin (16–18 October 2009) 
Both enjoying a comeback to the top level of Magic, Brian Kibler and Tsuyoshi Ikeda met in the finals, with Kibler winning in his second top eight in 2009.

Tournament data 

Prize pool: $230,795
Players: 416
Format: Extended, Booster Draft
Head Judge: Riccardo Tessitori

Top 8

Final standings

Pro Player of the year standings

Grand Prixs – Tampa, Kitakyushu, Paris, Minneapolis 

GP Tampa (24–25 October)
Attendance: 834
Format: Limited
 Gaudenis Vidugiris
 Conley Woods
 John Skinner
 John May
 Gabriel Nassif
 Alex Majlaton
 Tom Ross
 Martin Juza

GP Minneapolis (14–15 November)
Attendance: 1187
Format: Limited
 Zohar Bhagat
 Matthew Sperling
 Brian Kibler
 Brad Nelson
 Owen Turtenwald
 David Ochoa
 Mike Gualtieri
 Tom Ross

GP Kitakyushu (31 October – 1 November)
Attendance: 501
Format: Limited
 Taisuke Ishii
 Masashi Oiso
 Jun'ya Iyanaga
 Ken Yukuhiro
 Yuuya Watanabe
 Katsuhiro Mori
 Takeshi Takagi
 Hironobu Sugaya

GP Paris (7–8 November)
Attendance: 1961
Format: Limited
 Adrian Rosada
 Danny Ecker
 Lino Burgold
 Niels Viaene
 Herbert Engleitner
 Bernd Brendemühl
 Jérémy Dezani
 Gonzague Allouchery

2009 World Championships – Rome (19–22 November 2009) 

The 2009 World Championship marked several firsts in Pro Tour history. For the first time ever, eight different countries were represented in the quarterfinals, and there were no American or Japanese players in the top eight. Playing in his second Worlds top eight, André Coimbra of Portugal defeated Austrian David Reitbauer to become World Champion. In the team event, Austria finished second as well, losing to the Chinese team in the final.

Tournament data 

Prize pool: $245,245 (individual) + $192,425 (teams)
Players: 409 (55 National teams)
Formats: Standard, Booster Draft, Extended
Team Formats: Standard, Extended, Legacy
Head Judge: Sheldon Menery

Top 8

Final standings

National team competition 

  China (Wu Tong, Bo Li, Zhiyang Zhang)
  Austria (Benedikt Klauser, Benjamin Rozhon, Bernhard Lehner)
  Czech Republic (Lukas Jaklovsky, Lukas Blohon, Jan Kotrla)
  Netherlands (Kevin Grove, Niels Noorlander, Tom van Lamoen)

Pro Player of the year final standings 

After the World Championship, Yuuya Watanabe was awarded the Pro Player of the year title, making him the fifth consecutive Japanese player to win the award.

Performance by country 

The United States had the most Top 8 appearances at ten, but they also had by far the most players playing in the Pro Tour. With Japan at 17 they share the highest number of level 4+ professional Magic players, too.

T8 = Number of players from that country appearing in a Pro Tour Top 8; Q = Number of players from that country participating in Pro Tours; M = Median finish over all PTs; GT = Gravy Trainers (aka players with a Pro Players Club level of 4 or more) from that country created in the 2009 season; Best Player (PPts) = Player with the most Pro Points from that country, Pro Points of that player in brackets.

References 

Magic: The Gathering professional events